Darko Zibar (born 4 September 1958) is a Croatian rower. He competed in the men's quadruple sculls event at the 1980 Summer Olympics.

References

1958 births
Living people
Croatian male rowers
Olympic rowers of Yugoslavia
Rowers at the 1980 Summer Olympics
Sportspeople from Osijek